Miss Earth Australia is a national beauty pageant that selects Australia's representative to the Miss Earth pageant.

Titleholders

Below are the winners of Miss Earth Australia their special awards received and their final placements in the global beauty competition are also displayed.

Color keys

See also

 Miss Australia
 Miss Universe Australia
 Miss World Australia
 Miss International Australia

 Miss Earth
 List of beauty contests

References

External links

Australia
Australian awards
Beauty pageants in Australia